Frances M. A. Roe, born Frances Marie Antoinette Mack (22 August 1846 – 6 May 1920) was the daughter of Ralph Gilbert Make and Mary Colton Mack of Watertown, New  York. On August 19, 1871, she married U. S. Army officer Fayette Washington Roe, who ultimately became a Lieutenant Colonel, and was sent to Fort Lyon in Colorado Territory in 1871. She accompanied him and recorded her life during these years in a memoir. While her husband's career has been described as "unremarkable", Roe continues to be known on the basis of her book for the accurate picture of Army life it painted. Black soldiers from this period became known as the "Buffalo Soldiers"; Roe's was the first documented use of the name. Roe said of the Buffalo Soldiers: 

Roe died in Port Orange, Florida, and was buried with her husband at Arlington National Cemetery, in Arlington, Virginia.

Works 
 Army letters from an officer's wife, 1871–1888, 1909

References

External links 
 
 
 
 

1920 deaths
American memoirists
Year of birth unknown
Burials at Arlington National Cemetery
American women memoirists
1846 births